Li Hexin (born 16 September 1985) is a Chinese handball player who competed in the 2008 Summer Olympics.

References

1985 births
Living people
Olympic handball players of China
Chinese male handball players
Handball players at the 2008 Summer Olympics
Handball players from Shandong
Sportspeople from Jinan
Handball players at the 2014 Asian Games
Asian Games competitors for China